Lampanyctus intricarius is a species of lanternfish.

References

External links

Lampanyctus
Fish described in 1928
Taxa named by Åge Vedel Tåning